Ifwat Ismail  is a Singaporean footballer currently playing as a forward for Geylang International.

He scored a hat-trick against Tampines Rovers in the league cup.

Career statistics 
As @ 21 Sept 2019

References

1997 births
Living people
Singaporean footballers
Association football midfielders
Singapore Premier League players
Geylang International FC players
Young Lions FC players